Emyr Wyn Lewis (born 3 October 1982) is 17 stone, 6 ft  retired Welsh rugby union footballer. Emyr signed on to play for Neath RFC for the 2009–2010 season. He moved from Spanish Giants, El Salvador at the end of the 2008–2009 season, after coming runners up in the countries Division De Honor league.

In 2007-2008 Emyr made his European Challenge Cup debut against Connacht at Pepe Rojo (Spain) and also went on to play against Newcastle at Kingston Park. In 2008-2009 Emyr played in the competition again for El Salvador. Emyr started all six of the games home and away, against Brive, Newcastle and Parma and played through to the final whistle.

Emyr Lewis has previously played for, Newport RFC, Birmingham & Solihull RFC, Stoke RFC (Nelson Bays RFU, NZ), Gloucester RFC, Swansea RFC U-19's and  where he began his playing career at Amman United RFC.

He has also represented the Welsh Exiles and the Welsh Crawsheys XV.

Notes

1982 births
Living people
Rugby union players from Swansea
Welsh rugby union players
Newport RFC players
Neath RFC players
Rugby union props